The 2019 Mid-Eastern Athletic Conference women's basketball tournament took place March 11–15, 2019, at the Norfolk Scope in Norfolk, Virginia. The first round games were played on March 11 and March 12, and the quarterfinal games will be played on March 13 and 14. The semifinals were held on March 15, with the championship game on March 16. Bethune-Cookman won the championship game over Norfolk State to earn their first ever bid to the NCAA Division I women's basketball tournament.

Seeds 
All 12 teams were eligible for the tournament.

Teams were seeded by record within the conference, with a tiebreaker system to seed teams with identical conference records.

Schedule

Bracket

References

External links
 Official site

2018–19 Mid-Eastern Athletic Conference women's basketball season
MEAC women's basketball tournament
Basketball competitions in Norfolk, Virginia
College basketball tournaments in Virginia
Women's sports in Virginia